Alexander Michael McQuade (born 7 November 1992) is an English footballer playing for Widnes. He had a short spell playing in the Football League for Shrewsbury Town.

Career

Bolton Wanderers and Shrewsbury Town
McQuade began his career with Bolton Wanderers. Having progressed through the academy system, he signed a one-year professional contract in July 2012. He was released by the club when his contract was due to come to an end in the summer of 2013.

McQuade joined Shrewsbury Town in a deal announced in April 2013. He made his Football League debut as a late substitute in a 0–0 draw against Milton Keynes Dons on 3 August 2013.

On 28 February 2014, McQuade joined Conference side Hyde on an initial one-month loan. He made his debut for the club a day later, in a 2–1 defeat away at Braintree Town. The loan was later extended until the end of the season.

McQuade was released at the end of his contract in May 2014 having made only a single league appearance for Shrewsbury.

Non-league

In July 2014, McQuade joined Wrexham on trial and played in a 1–0 win over Swansea City under 21s in the Dragons' first pre season friendly, however he was not offered a contract. In the 2014-15 season he had short spells at Guiseley, former loan club Hyde, and Farsley. Ahead of the 2015−16 season, he joined Warrington Town.

McQuade emigrated to Australia in February 2016, spending time with Banyule City, before returning to English non-league football, joining Ossett Albion in December 2017. He then moved to Ossett's new team, Ossett United, in the summer of 2018. In June 2019, he joined Buxton FC. On 30 August 2019, he joined Ossett Town A.F.C. on a short-term loan. At the end of January 2020, McQuade joined Widnes.

Career statistics
Last updated 27 April 2014.

"Other" column denotes performances in Football League Trophy

References

External links

1992 births
Living people
English footballers
Association football forwards
Bolton Wanderers F.C. players
Shrewsbury Town F.C. players
Hyde United F.C. players
Guiseley A.F.C. players
Farsley Celtic F.C. players
Warrington Town F.C. players
English Football League players
Footballers from Rotherham
Ossett Albion A.F.C. players
Ossett United F.C. players
Buxton F.C. players
Ossett Town F.C. players
Widnes F.C. players
Footballers from Manchester
Expatriate soccer players in Australia
English expatriate footballers
English expatriate sportspeople in Australia